Chris Sulages (born January 25, 1973) is an American football coach and former player.  He was the head football coach at Lewis & Clark College from 2006 until 2015.  Sulages revived the Pioneers football program from consecutive winless seasons in 2006 and 2007 to a 7–2 record and second place in the Northwest Conference in 2011, which earned him the distinction of D3football.com's West Region Coach of the Year.

Coaching career
From 2001 to 2002, Sulages coached offensive line and tight ends at Division I-AA Cal State Northridge. In 2001, the Matadors sported the #2 total offense in the nation.  Sulages was a CSU-N recruiting coordinator, fitness instructor, and NCAA eligibility liaison.

Sulages is a former head coach for the Prague Panthers in the Czech Republic.  While coaching in Prague, his teams were the #1 rushing offense, #1 total offense and total defense in the Czech League.  The Panthers made two Euro Bowl playoff appearances and earned one national title.

Sulages' NCAA Division III experience includes a three-year stint as an assistant offensive coach at Occidental College where he coordinated the Tiger run game and pass protection schemes for the #1 rushing offense in the Southern California Intercollegiate Athletic Conference.  He has also worked with the offensive line, tight ends, and special teams at the University of San Diego and Weber State University.

A graduate of Weber State, Sulages played two seasons on the Wildcat offensive line where he received All-Big Sky Conference honors. He earned a degree in English with a minor in physical education and coaching.  He played two years of junior college football at Saddleback College, where he was all-conference and helped lead the Gauchos to the 1992 Junior College National Championship.  He earned a degree in liberal studies at Saddleback.

Head coaching record

College

References

1973 births
Living people
American football offensive linemen
Cal State Northridge Matadors football coaches
Lewis & Clark Pioneers football coaches
Occidental Tigers football coaches
San Diego Toreros football coaches
Weber State Wildcats football coaches
Weber State Wildcats football players
Saddleback Gauchos football players
Sportspeople from Mission Viejo, California
Players of American football from California
American expatriate sportspeople in the Czech Republic